Illdisposed is a Danish death metal band from Aarhus, that was formed in 1991 by vocalist Bo Summer and guitarist Lasse Bak. As of 2020, the band consists of vocalist Bo Summer, guitarists Jakob Batten and Rasmus Henriksen, bassist Kussen and drummer Rasmus Schmidt.

Since the beginning of the 1990s, Illdisposed have been one of the top bands of the Nordic death metal scene and have released 13 albums and two EPs. Illdisposed have developed their own form of death metal with groovy rhythms, melodic but still hard hitting riffs and a massive wall of sound with a unique subwoofer vocal in focus.

History

Four Depressive Seasons, Submit and There's Something Rotten… (1992–1997) 

In early 1991, Illdisposed was formed and soon released their first demo entitled The Winter of Our Discontempt, this demo brought the band a deal with Nuclear Blast Records. In the end of 1992, the band contributed with the track "Reversed" to the compilation Fuck You, We're from Denmark, released by Progress Red Labels, followed by 1993's debut album Four Depressive Seasons, and in December 1993 toured in Europe as support for Wargasm and Sinister. In 1994 guitarist Hans Wagner was fired, due to problems with alcoholism, and was temporarily replaced by Morten Gilsted. In 1994 The first EP "Return from Tomorrow" was released. In early 1995, drummer Lars Hald performed for some live concerts, the second studio album Submit was released with new drummer Rolf Rognvard-Hansen, previously had been guitarist for Caustic from Esbjerg. During the tour in Germany to promote the album, guitarist Lasse Bak played several concerts naked. There's Something Rotten... In the State of Denmark is the third studio album, and was released in 1997. This album marked the departure of guitarist Morten Gilsted replaced by ex-roadie Tore Mogensen. While recording the album, the band was featured in the documentary "Headbang i Hovedlandet" alongside future member Jakob 'Batten' Hansen's band Infernal Torment in 1997.

Retro and Kokaiinum (1998–2002) 

In 2000, Illdisposed released the tribute album Retro, with covers of bands such as Carcass, Autopsy, Darkthrone, Venom, Motörhead, and AC/DC. It was the first album to feature guitarist Jakob "Batten" Hansen, who joined the band in 1999, after Lasse Bak's brother Ronnie Bak had left.
This was followed by their fourth album Kokaiinum in 2001, which featured original songs only. The song "Fear Bill Gates" was only one example of the band's sense of humor. Kokaiinum sometimes fused more melodic elements in the music, but still retained the groove/death metal style, that the band was known for.

From 1-800 Vindication to To Those Who Walk Behind Us (2003–2009) 

The band went on short hiatus because Bo needed time to cure his alcoholism. In 2003, they went back together, to release the "Promo 2003" CD, which already included some songs from the upcoming album 1-800 Vindication, those were "Jeff" and "Dark". The band had found new members in Thomas "Muskelbux" Jensen on drums and Jonas "Kloge" Mikkelsen on bass. Tore Mogensen left the band during that time and started working at TC Electronics, while Jakob "Batten" Hansen switched from bass to lead guitar. 
In 2004, 1-800 Vindication was released. It was the band's most successful album, released on Roadrunner Records. The song "Still Sane" was released as a single and a video was shot for it by Lasse Hoile, who also designed the artwork for the album.
The release was followed by a tour and a DVD, shot in Arhus, entitled "We suck - live in Arhus". This DVD was during that time only available as a bootleg, but went on to be sold regularly, due to its high quality.

In 2005, guitarist and founding member Lasse Bak left the band to join his former Illdisposed band comrades Rolf Hansen and Morten Gilsted in Slow Death Factory.
A short-lived replacement was found in ex-roadie and Exmortem guitarist Martin Thim, who joined during the recording of the band's sixth studio album Burn Me Wicked, released in 2006 on Roadrunner Records. The music on Burn Me Wicked was written almost entirely by Jakob Hansen, who recorded demos of the songs on his computer at home and then passed it to the other members. The two Roadrunner albums are the most successful Illdisposed albums to date, with sales of 30,000 copies each (before the re-release on Massacre). After an extensive tour, the band went back in the studio again, to record their seventh album The Prestige. The Prestige took the band more back to their roots and sounded more straightforward and rawer than its predecessors. Before recording started, Martin Thim left the band to focus more on his day job; he was replaced by ex-Volbeat guitarist Franz "Hellboss" Gottschalk. One of their most successful gigs was the With Full Force festival in Germany, where the band presented  The Prestige in front of over 70,000 people. A live video of the song "A Child Is Missing" can be found on the band's website.

Only one year later, the band hit the studio again with a new record deal on Massacre Records, after Roadrunner dissolved the contract to the band. In 2009, Massacre Records released the new album To Those Who Walk Behind Us as well as re-releasing Illdisposed's Roadrunner albums 1-800 Vindication and Burn Me Wicked. This album was produced by Illdisposed's guitarist Jakob "Batten" Hansen and mixed by longtime friend Tue Madsen. To Those Who Walk Behind Us represented a mix between the band's more traditional death-metal sound and their use of synthesizers on albums like 1-800 Vindication and Burn Me Wicked.

On 23 June 2012, The original Illdisposed Line Up consisting of Bo Summer, Lasse Bak, Ronnie Bak, Morten Gilsted and Rolf Hansen, played a reunion show at Lasse Bak's 40th Birthday.

Discography

Studio albums 
 Four Depressive Seasons (1993), Progress Red Labels
Submit (1995), Progress Records
 There's Something Rotten... In the State of Denmark (1997), Serious Entertainment
 Retro (2000), Diehard Music
 Kokaiinum (2001), Diehard Music
 1-800 Vindication (2004), Roadrunner Records
 Burn Me Wicked (2006), Roadrunner Records
 The Prestige (2008), AFM Records
 To Those Who Walk Behind Us (2009), Massacre Records
 There Is Light (But It's Not for Me) (2011), Massacre Records
 Sense the Darkness (2012), Massacre Records
 With the Lost Souls on Our Side (2014), Massacre Records
 Grey Sky Over Black Town (2016), Massacre Records
 Reveal Your Soul for the Dead (2019)

EPs 
 Return from Tomorrow (EP, 1994), Progress Red Labels
 Demo 2003 (EP, 2003) Independent release

Compilations 
 Helvede (1995, RSS)
 The Best of Illdisposed 2004–2011 (2012, Massacre Records)

DVDs 
 We Suck – Live Aarhus (live DVD, 2004)

Band members

Current members 
 Bo "Subwoofer" Summer – vocals 
 Jakob "Batten" Hansen – guitars , bass 
 Rasmus Henriksen – guitars 
 Onkel K. Jensen – bass  
 Rasmus Schmidt - drums

Former members 
 Hans Wagner – guitars 
 Michael "Panzergeneral" Enevoldsen – drums 
 Morten Gilsted – guitars 
 Ronnie Raabjerg Bak – bass 
 Lasse Dennis Raabjerg Bak – guitars 
 Lars Hald – drums 
 Rolf Hansen – drums 
 Tore "The Pimp" Mogensen – guitars 
 Jonas "Kloge" Mikkelsen – bass 
 Thomas "Muskelbux" Jensen – drums 
 Martin Thim – guitars 
 Franz Gottschalk – guitars 
 Kim Langkjaer Jensen - drums  
 Ken Holst - guitars

Timeline

References

External links 

 Illdisposed — official website
 Illdisposed at MySpace

Danish death metal musical groups
Danish heavy metal musical groups
Musical groups established in 1991
Musical quintets
1991 establishments in Denmark
Candlelight Records artists